Clathurella capaniola is a species of sea snail, a marine gastropod mollusk in the family Clathurellidae.

Description

Distribution
This species occurs in the Pacific Ocean along California, USA.

References

capaniola
Gastropods described in 1919